Viscome may refer to:

George R. Viscome (born 1956), American astronomer
6183 Viscome, main-belt asteroid